Rubén Piaggio  (born 2 April 1970) is a former Argentine footballer, considered one of the best attacking midfielders in his country during the 1990s. Ferrocarril Oeste fans called him "Ciruelo" ("The Plum"). In 1996, he became the first Ferro player in history to score a hat-trick against Boca Juniors.

Career
Piaggio played for Gimnasia y Esgrima (LP), Gimnasia de Jujuy, Ferro Carril Oeste and Huracán in the Primera División Argentina. He also had spells with Internacional in the Campeonato Brasileiro Série A, Tigres in the Primera División de Mexico, Marítimo in the Portuguese Liga, Ionikos in the Greek Super League and Racing de Ferrol in Segunda División.

Personal life
Like Piaggio, his father and brother were footballers; though only in regional football. Two of his nephews, Fermín and Juan Antonini, are professional footballers.

References

1970 births
Living people
Argentine footballers
Argentine expatriate footballers
Club de Gimnasia y Esgrima La Plata footballers
Unión de Santa Fe footballers
Ferro Carril Oeste footballers
Gimnasia y Esgrima de Jujuy footballers
Club Atlético Huracán footballers
Sport Club Internacional players
Deportes Concepción (Chile) footballers
Tigres UANL footballers
C.S. Marítimo players
Ionikos F.C. players
Racing de Ferrol footballers
Granada CF footballers
Argentine Primera División players
Primeira Liga players
Super League Greece players
Expatriate footballers in Chile
Expatriate footballers in Brazil
Expatriate footballers in Greece
Expatriate footballers in Mexico
Expatriate footballers in Spain
Expatriate footballers in Portugal
Sportspeople from Buenos Aires Province
Association football midfielders
Argentine people of Italian descent